Sun Tzu or Sunzi (fl. 6th century BC), was a Chinese military general, strategist, and philosopher credited as the author of The Art of War.

Sun Tzu may also refer to:

 Sun Bin (fl. 4th century BC), Sun Tzu's alleged descendant who wrote Sun Bin's Art of War for Qi
 Sun Tzu or Sunzi (fl. 4th century AD), mathematician, author of Sunzi Suanjing
 Sun Tzu chess, a variation of dark chess
 Sun Tzu: War on Business (2010 TV series), a Singaporean reality show starting James Sun

See also

 Sun Zi Bing Fa Yu San Shi Liu Ji, 2020 PRC Mandarin Chinese TV series
 Sun (surname), for other masters surnamed Sun
 Master (disambiguation)
 Sun (disambiguation)
 Tzu (disambiguation)
 Zi (disambiguation)